The griddle scone (most dialects of English) or girdle scone (Scots and Northumbrian English) is a variety of scone which is baked on a griddle or frying pan rather than in an oven.

In New Zealand, griddle scones are generally cooked as one large disk shaped mass which is divided into wedges for serving, often with golden syrup or jam.

Name 

In the Scots language and the Northumbrian English dialect, a griddle is called a girdle.  The transposition of the sounds is due to linguistic metathesis. Therefore, griddle scones are known as girdle scones. This usage is also common in New Zealand where scones, of all varieties, form an important part of the traditional cuisine.

See also

 List of quick breads
Welsh cake – may also be cooked on a griddle

References

Further reading 
 

British breads
Quick breads
Scottish breads
New Zealand breads